José Gastón Salcedo Contreras (born 12 January 1980) is a Chilean retired footballer who played as a midfielder. His last club was Deportes Iberia.

External links
 José Salcedo at Football-Lineups
 
 

1980 births
Living people
Chilean footballers
People from Los Ángeles, Chile
Association football midfielders
Deportes Iberia footballers
Malleco Unido footballers
Lota Schwager footballers
Unión Española footballers
Rangers de Talca footballers
Cobreloa footballers
Chilean Primera División players
Primera B de Chile players
Segunda División Profesional de Chile players